The Georgia Regional Transportation Authority (GRTA,  "Greta") is a government agency in the U.S. state of Georgia.  It was set up under former governor of Georgia Roy Barnes, in order to address mobility, air quality and land use and how they relate to the transportation needs of metro Atlanta, including both roads and public transit. It came about in large part because the numerous cities and counties in the region could not effectively (or would not at all) work with each other to achieve a comprehensive solution to the area's traffic woes, and increasing summertime smog problems.

GRTA's jurisdiction encompasses 13 Georgia counties in Metro Atlanta: Cherokee, Clayton, Coweta, Cobb, DeKalb, Douglas, Fayette, Forsyth, Fulton, Gwinnett, Henry, Paulding, and Rockdale.

Xpress Regional Commuter Coach Service

GRTA, in partnership with 12 metropolitan Atlanta counties, operates Xpress, metropolitan Atlanta's first truly regional commuter transit bus system. As of February 25, 2013 33 Xpress routes are in operation. Unless noted, service is provided by a private operator under contract to GRTA Xpress. Service hours are from roughly 5:30 a.m. to 9:30 p.m. weekdays with most service being rush hours only.

See also
 Metro Atlanta Rapid Transit Authority

References

External links
GRTA website
Xpress website
MARTA website
CCT website
GCT website
CATS website

Transit agencies in Georgia (U.S. state)
Transportation Regional